Trematocara variabile is a species of cichlid endemic to Lake Tanganyika.  This species can reach a length of  TL.

References

variabile
Fish described in 1952
Taxonomy articles created by Polbot